A Boy Bringing Bread (c. 1663) is an oil-on-canvas painting by the Dutch painter Pieter de Hooch. It is an example of Dutch Golden Age painting and is part of The Wallace Collection.

Descriptions and commentary
A boy offers a basket of bread to a lady in an interior; behind them a tiled courtyard leads into another dark interior, beyond which can be seen a canal with a second woman, possibly the boy’s mother, watching the transaction from afar. With its masterly illusion of receding depth, the picture demonstrates De Hooch’s sensitivity to differing effects of daylight in adjoining spaces, in this case through a series of indoor and outdoor spaces. Originally a girl reading a book sat in the doorway, but she was painted out in favour of the lady and the boy, whose stance echoes the verticality of the architecture and prompts the eye to travel upwards into the picture space. By paring down his composition De Hooch focuses the viewer’s attention and imbues the scene with intensified quietude.

This painting by Hooch was documented by Hofstede de Groot in 1910, who wrote:34. THE BOY BRINGING ROLLS OR APPLES. Sm. Suppl. 45.; de G. 54. The picture shows a room, the wall of which is almost filled by a high window with coats-of-arms on the right, and by the open house-door on the left. At the door stands a boy with long hair looking towards the spectator; he wears a white cap, a grey jacket and frock adorned with coloured ribbons. He holds in his hand a basket of rolls or apples, which a young woman, leaning forward and seen in lost profile, is taking from him. She wears a black silk hood, a black velvet jacket, a red silk skirt, and a white apron. The door looks on a path, paved with tiles and bordered with a fence, which leads across the courtyard to the entrance hall under a stone doorway decorated with a coat-of-arms. Beyond is a canal, on the other side of which a woman stands behind the half-door of a house. In the right foreground is a chair with a cushion. 
The whole scene is dominated by the red and black of the woman's costume. There are bluish tones in the shadow. It probably dates from 1665; it is more vigorous in tone than the other picture in the same collection (33), and is probably somewhat earlier.

The coat-of-arms over the doorway is "or, a fess azure". The arms on the window bear the inscription, to the left "Cornelis Jansz" or "Jac.," to the right "Marnie," or "Maerti." To the left is the monogram of the man's family: an "M," from the midst of which rises a shaft bearing a small "c" and ending in a "4." To the right is that of the woman's family: in a lozenge, a shaft, with two cross strokes above and two strokes meeting at an angle below, has an "M" to the left and a "C" to the right.

Canvas, 29 inches by 23 inches. Sales:
 M. T. Andrioli, widow of Jan Cliquet, in Amsterdam, July 18, 1803 (800 florins, C. S. Roos). 
 Van Brienen van de Grootelindt of Amsterdam, in Paris, September 8, 1865, No. 14 (50,000 francs). 
Now in the Wallace collection, London, No. 27 in the 1901 catalogue.

Provenance
Purchased by Richard Seymour-Conway, 4th Marquess of Hertford for his collection c. 1856.

References

External links
Wallace Collection

1660s paintings
Paintings in the Wallace Collection
Paintings by Pieter de Hooch
Paintings of children